Cladochytrium is a genus of fungi. It is the type genus of the family Cladochytriaceae.

 Names brought to synonymy
 Cladochytrium alfalfae, a synonym for Physoderma alfalfae, a plant pathogen that causes crown wart of alfalfa
 Cladochytrium elegans, a synonym for Nowakowskiella elegans

References

External links 
 
 

Chytridiomycota genera